Metisotoma grandiceps is a species of elongate-bodied springtail in the family Isotomidae. It is the only predatory springtail known so far.

References

Collembola
Articles created by Qbugbot
Animals described in 1891